The 2017 FIBA Women's AfroBasket was the 23rd AfroBasket Women, played under the rules of FIBA, the world governing body for basketball, and FIBA Africa. The tournament was hosted by Mali from 18 to 27 August, with games played at Bamako. The winners and runners-up qualified for the 2018 FIBA Women's Basketball World Cup. 

Nigeria won their third title after defeating Senegal 65–48 in the final.

Venue

Squads

Qualification

Preliminary round
The draw of the FIBA Women's AfroBasket 2017 took place on 27 May in Bamako, Mali.

All times are local (UTC±0).

Group A

Group B

Knockout stage

Bracket

5th place bracket

9th place bracket

Quarterfinals

9–12th place semifinals

5–8th place semifinals

Semifinals

Eleventh place game

Ninth place game

Seventh place game

Fifth place game

Third place game

Final

Final standing

Statistics and awards

Statistical leaders

Points

Rebounds

Assists

Blocks

Steals

Awards

Most Valuable Player:  Astou Traoré
All-Star Team:
PG –  Evelyn Akhator
SG –  Italee Lucas
SF –  Leia Dongue
PF –  Astou Traoré
C  –  Naîgnouma Coulibaly

References

External links
Official website

2017
2017 in African basketball
2017 in Malian sport
International women's basketball competitions hosted by Mali
Sport in Bamako
Women's Afrobasket
2017 in women's basketball